Isthmus Mixe, called Lowland Mixe in Wichmann (1995), is a Mixe language spoken in Mexico. It is spoken in the villages of Coatlán San José el Paraíso, Mazatlán, Guichicovi, and Camotlán, Oaxaca.

Grammar 
Isthmus Mixe is SOV word order. It contains prepositions and postpositions, genitives and demonstratives before noun heads, and relative clauses after the head. Isthmus Mixe is usually categorized as agglutinating.

Phonology

Dieterman believes every consonant may be modified by the addition of secondary palatalization.

See also 

 Norman Nordell's Isthmus Mixe to Spanish dictionary (1990) published by SIL

References

Mixe–Zoque languages